Pierre-Yves Cardinal (born 24 July 1978) is a Canadian film and television actor. He is best known for his role as Francis in Xavier Dolan's Tom at the Farm, for which he garnered a Canadian Screen Award nomination as Best Supporting Actor at the 2nd Canadian Screen Awards, and won a Jutra Award as Best Supporting Actor at the 17th Jutra Awards.

He has also appeared in the films Polytechnique, Adrien (Le Garagiste), Anna, Les Salopes, or the Naturally Wanton Pleasure of Skin, Le Fils de Jean, Venus, Nadia, Butterfly, Sam and Goodbye Happiness (Au revoir le bonheur), and the television series Trauma, 19-2 and Les Jeunes loups.

References

External links

Canadian male film actors
Canadian male television actors
Male actors from Quebec
Living people
1978 births
Best Supporting Actor Jutra and Iris Award winners